Igor Melher (born 1 novembar 1979 in Mostar, SR Bosnia and Herzegovina, SFR Yugoslavia) is a  Bosnian-Herzegovinian retired football player. He played for Zrinjski in the Bosnian-Herzegovinian Premier League.

International career
He made his debut for Bosnia and Herzegovina in a March 2004 friendly match against Luxembourg, coming on as a late substitute for Goran Brašnić. It remained his sole international appearance.

European statistics

Games for Zrinjski in European competitions

References

External links
Igor Melher profile

1979 births
Living people
Sportspeople from Mostar
Croats of Bosnia and Herzegovina
Association football goalkeepers
Bosnia and Herzegovina footballers
Bosnia and Herzegovina international footballers
HŠK Zrinjski Mostar players
HŠK Posušje players
NK Široki Brijeg players
Zalaegerszegi TE players
NK GOŠK Gabela players
Premier League of Bosnia and Herzegovina players
First League of the Federation of Bosnia and Herzegovina players